The Billiou–Stillwell–Perine House is a Dutch Colonial structure and the oldest standing building on Staten Island, New York.

History
The house was originally built by Pierre Billiou, a Huguenot who arrived at New Amsterdam fleeing religious persecution in Europe in 1661. He founded Oude Dorp (Old Town) in the same year, and subsequently received a land grant on Staten Island, erecting the original stone section of the house around 1662. His daughter Martha (1652–1736) inherited the property and resided there with her husband, Thomas Stillwell (1651–1704/1705), and later with her second husband, Rev. David de Bonrepos (1654–1734), whom she married in 1711. Also family decedents of the Billiou family are still living in America to this date of 2021 with a modernized name of Bilyeu. Most of the family lives in the state of Tennessee.
(edited by a descendent Zachary Bilyeu) There are also descendants in Kansas, Washington state, Oregon and a branch in Ohio.

About 1680, Thomas Stillwell, a well-to-do landowner, enlarged the house. His and Martha's descendants, the Brittons, owned it until the mid-18th century. It was then acquired in 1758 by Edward Perine, whose family owned it until 1913.

The building has a shingled sloping roof, a high jambless fireplace with a large stone hearth, and a ceiling with exceptionally large beams. Owned by Historic Richmond Town, the house is occasionally open to the public on a limited schedule or by appointment.

See also
 List of the oldest buildings in the United States
 List of the oldest buildings in New York
 List of New York City Designated Landmarks in Staten Island
 National Register of Historic Places listings in Richmond County, New York

References

External links

 Billiou-Stillwell-Perine House, Landmarks Preservation Commission
 Billiou-Stillwell-Perine House, Historic Richmond Town
 The Story and Documentary History of the Perine House, Staten Island Antiquarian Society, 1915

Houses on the National Register of Historic Places in Staten Island
Historic house museums in New York City
Huguenot history in the United States
New York City Designated Landmarks in Staten Island
1662 establishments in North America
Establishments in New Netherland
Colonial architecture in New York (state)